Stop to Love is a compilation album by American R&B/soul singer Luther Vandross, released in 2002.

Track listing
"The Glow of Love" (Change featuring Luther Vandross) - 6:12
"I Can't Wait No Longer (Let's Do This)" (Featuring Deidra "Spin" Roper) - 5:38
"Ain't No Stoppin' Us Now" - 4:53
"Give Me the Reason" - 4:45
"Lady, Lady" - 5:33
"Never Too Much" - 3:51
"I Can Tell You That" - 5:25
"Heaven Knows" - 5:01
"The Rush" - 6:45
"Stop to Love" - 5:10

2002 compilation albums
Luther Vandross compilation albums